is a Japanese racing cyclist. She rode in the women's road race event at the 2018 UCI Road World Championships. She was selected to the 2020 Summer Olympics team, and finished in 43rd place in the women's road race.

Major results
Source: 

2012
 3rd Road race, National Road Championships
2013
 2nd Road race, National Road Championships
 9th Overall Tour of Thailand
2015
 National Road Championships
3rd Time trial
3rd Road race
2016
 9th Road race, Asian Road Championships
2017
 3rd Road race, National Road Championships
 5th Overall Tour of Thailand
2018
 2nd Road race, National Road Championships
2019
 2nd Road race, National Road Championships
2021
 2nd Road race, National Road Championships
2022
 3rd Road race, National Road Championships

References

External links
 

1980 births
Living people
Japanese female cyclists
Place of birth missing (living people)
Olympic cyclists of Japan
Cyclists at the 2020 Summer Olympics
20th-century Japanese women
21st-century Japanese women